Phil Robson is a British jazz guitarist, bandleader, and composer currently based in New York City.

Biography
Born in Derby (Derbyshire), England in 1970, Robson began guitar studies at age 14. He played in the house rhythm section at the local club with visiting musicians as John Etheridge and Bheki Mseleku as well as with his clarinettist father, Trevor Robson. He moved to London at the age of 18 where he studied at the Guildhall School Of Music and Drama, being the youngest student at the time to do the post graduate course in jazz studies. He went on to be an integral part of the London scene and has since been the leader of several acclaimed musical projects of his own as well as appearing as a sideman with many international artists including Barbra Streisand, Django Bates, Mark Turner, Kenny Wheeler, David Liebman, Dame Cleo Laine, Maceo Parker, Donny McCaslin, and Charles Earland, among others. He also co-led the seminal UK jazz rock band "Partisans" with Julian Siegel and has been a long time partner of the Irish singer/songwriter Christine Tobin. 
Robson is a recording artist for Babel Label and more recently Whirlwind Recordings.

Phil is a professor of music at Trinity College Of Music, the Guildhall School of Music and Drama, and the Royal Academy of Music. He was elected in 2015 as an honorary associate of the Royal Academy Of Music. He has been a visiting tutor at summer schools including 'The Dordogne International Jazz Summer School' in France, 'The European Jazz Academy' in Germany, and continues to be an educator.

Work
As a leader, Robson has played with:
Phil Robson Quartet featuring Jed Levy. With Jed Levy sax, Clarence Penn/Jason Brown drums and Peter Slavov/Oli Hayhurst bass.  
Phil Robson Organ Trio with Ross Stanley organ and Gene Calderazzo drums. 
The Immeasurable Code Quintet with Mark Turner/Julian Arguelles – sax, Gareth Lockrane – flute, Michael Janisch – bass and Ernesto Simpson – drums.
Six Strings & the Beat – with Peter Herbert – bass, Gene Calderazzo – drums, Mandy Drummond – violin, Jennymay Logan – violin, Naomi Fairhurst – viola, Kate Shortt – cello.
Phil Robson Trio – with New York drummer Billy Hart and James Genus on bass.
Phil Robson Quartet featuring saxophonist David Liebman and Jeff Williams.
Phil Robson Octet with Jason Yarde, Julian Siegel, Christine Tobin, Gene Calderazzo, Thebe Lipere, Karren Street.
Partisans with Julian Siegel.

In 2014 he released ‘The Cut Off Point’ an album with his organ trio which received critical acclaim.

Awards
Robson was elected ‘Best Jazz Musician Of The Year’ in the 2009 Parliamentary Jazz Awards. Swamp, his album with Partisans, was named ‘Jazz CD Of The Year’ in the 2015 Parliamentary Jazz Awards.
2015 elected as an ‘Honorary Associate of the Royal Academy of Music’.
1998 Perrier Young Jazz Award for the ‘Best Instrumentalist Of The Year’.
1997 BT Awards- ‘Best Soloist Of The Year’.

References

British jazz guitarists
British male guitarists
1970 births
Living people
British composers
Musicians from Derby
21st-century British guitarists
21st-century British male musicians
Whirlwind Recordings artists